The Emmons County Record is a weekly newspaper based in Linton, North Dakota.

It has been published continuously since the late 1800s, originally by D.R. Streeter.  In the late 1980s, while under the ownership of Cecil D. Jahraus, who was also the paper's editor and publisher, the Emmons County Record became the largest weekly newspaper in the state of North Dakota by circulation.  Read by over 4,000 families weekly, the newspaper had a circulation permeating all 50 U.S. states and three foreign countries.  Its present owner is the Burke family.

References

Newspapers published in North Dakota
Publications established in 1884
1884 establishments in Dakota Territory
Emmons County, North Dakota